The Sahuayo Fútbol Club, commonly known as Sahuayo, is a Mexican football club based in Sahuayo. The club was founded in 2013, and currently plays in the Liga TDP, the club played in Serie B of Liga Premier, but in 2019, this team was dissolved, maintaining the third division squad.

Players

Current squad

References 

Association football clubs established in 2013
Football clubs in Michoacán
2013 establishments in Mexico
Liga Premier de México